A referendum on the future of the Soviet Union was held on 17 March 1991 across the Soviet Union. It was the only national referendum in the history of the Soviet Union, although it was boycotted by authorities in six of the fifteen Soviet republics.

The referendum asked whether to approve a new Union Treaty between the republics, to replace the 1922 treaty that created the USSR. The question put to most voters was: 

Do you consider necessary the preservation of the Union of Soviet Socialist Republics as a renewed federation of equal sovereign republics in which the rights and freedom of an individual of any ethnicity will be fully guaranteed?

In Kazakhstan, the wording of the referendum was changed by substituting "equal sovereign states" for "equal sovereign republics".

In Uzbekistan, Ukraine and Kyrgizia additional questions were asked about sovereignty and independence of these republics.

While the vote was boycotted by the authorities in Armenia, Estonia, Georgia (though not in the breakaway provinces of Abkhazia and South Ossetia), Latvia, Lithuania, and Moldova (though not in Transnistria or Gagauzia), turnout was 80% across the rest of the Soviet Union. 

The referendum's question was approved by nearly 80% of voters in all nine other republics that took part. But the August coup attempt by hardliners of the Communist Party prevented the anticipated signing of the new Union Treaty a day later. Although it failed, the coup attempt reduced confidence in Gorbachev's central government. It was followed by a series of referendums for independence in individual republics and led to the dissolution of the Soviet Union on 26 December 1991.

Question
The following question was asked:

Overview
On December 24, 1990, deputies of the 4th Congress of People's Deputies, having voted by name, decided to consider it necessary to preserve the USSR as a renewed federation of equal sovereign republics, which will be fully ensured human rights and freedoms of any nationality. The referendum considered five questions:

Do you consider it necessary to preserve the USSR as a renewed federation of equal sovereign republics, which will be fully ensured of human rights and freedoms of any nationality? (Yes/No)
Do you consider it necessary to preserve the USSR as a single state? (Yes/No)
Do you consider it necessary to preserve the socialist system in the USSR? (Yes/No)
Do you consider it necessary to preserve in the renovated Union of Soviet power? (Yes/No)
Do you feel the need to safeguard the Union in the renewed human rights and freedoms of any nationality? (Yes/No) (Any legal or legislative consequences, in case of acceptance of, or otherwise, was not specified)

On the same day, at the initiative and insistence of General Secretary and President Mikhail Gorbachev, the Congress adopted two decisions on holding a referendum on the private ownership of land [6] and on the preservation of the Union as a renewed federation of equal sovereign of Soviet Socialist Republics [7]. For the adoption of the first resolution voted in 1553 deputies, against - 84, abstained - 70. For the adoption of the second resolution voted in 1677 deputies, against - 32, abstained - 66.

However, concerning the first decision the Chairman YH Kalmykov later explained at a session of the Supreme Soviet of the USSR Supreme Council Committee for Legislation, the president asked to refrain from holding a referendum on the issue of private property.

Second course was given to the decree. It said that "due to numerous appeals of workers expressed concern about the fate of the USSR, and given that the preservation of a single union state is the most important issue of public life, affects the interests of each person, all the Soviet Union's population", the Congress of People's Deputies USSR decided:

1. Conduct a referendum of the USSR to address the issue of maintaining the Union as a renewed federation of equal sovereign Soviet Socialist Republics, taking into account the results of voting for each country separately.
2. To instruct the USSR Supreme Council set a date for the referendum and ensure its measures.
— Resolution of the USSR from LICs December 24, 1990 No. 1856-1

On 27 December 1990, Congress of People's Deputies of the USSR decided to enact it adopted on the day the Law of the USSR "On the popular vote (Soviet Union referendum)".

According to Art. 5 of the Law of the USSR "On the popular vote (Soviet Union referendum)"  Law of the USSR referendum destination belonged to the Congress of People's Deputies of the USSR, and on matters not related to the exclusive jurisdiction of the USSR Congress of People's Deputies, in the period between congresses – the Supreme Soviet of the USSR.
"Based on the fact that no one, except the people can not take the historical responsibility for the fate of the USSR, pursuant to the decision of the fourth Congress of People's Deputies of the USSR in accordance with the law on the referendum of the USSR" On January 16, 1991 the Supreme Council USSR decided that to:

Results

In participating republics

In republics not participating in the Soviet referendums 

An official referendum had been held in Estonia on 3 March 1991 on whether to restore the Estonian republic that had been occupied by the Soviet Union in 1940. The result was 77.8% in favour of restoring the Estonian republic. Latvia also held an official referendum on 3 March 1991, when the overwhelming majority voted to restore the independent Latvian republic. Lithuania had held a referendum on 9 February 1991, in which 93% of voters had approved independence.

Georgia was to hold its own independence referendum two weeks later, and Armenia on 21 September.

Consequently, in these republics,  pro-Soviet front-organisations organised voluntary referendums without official sanction. Turnout of voting here was considerably less than 50% of the franchised voters of these countries, but this information was not included in the official statement of the Central Commission of the Referendum of USSR.

Additional questions
In several of the republics, additional questions were added to the ballot. In Russia, an additional question was asked on whether an elective post of the president of Russia should be created. In Kirghizia, Ukraine and Uzbekistan the additional question was on the sovereignty of their republics as part of a new union.

Kirghizia
In Kirghizia, voters were also asked "Do you agree that the Republic of Kirghizistan should be in the renewed Union as a sovereign republic with equal rights?" It was approved by 62.2% of voters, although turnout was lower at 81.7%, compared to 92.9% in the Union-wide referendum.

Ukraine

In Ukraine, voters were also asked "Do you agree that Ukraine should be part of a Union of Soviet sovereign states on the basis on the Declaration of State Sovereignty of Ukraine?" The proposal was approved by 81.7% of voters. Ukraine later held its own referendum on 1 December, in which 92% voted for independence.

At the same day a referendum in the Galician  provinces Ivano-Frankivsk, Lviv, and Ternopil asked the three regions of the USSR about the creation of independent state of Ukraine. 88% of the voters in this referendum supported Ukraine's independence.

Uzbekistan
In Uzbekistan, voters were also asked "Do you agree that Uzbekistan should remain part of a renewed Union (federation) as a sovereign republic with equal rights?" It was approved by 94.9% of voters, with a turnout of 95.5%. On 29 December, 98% of Uzbeks would vote for full independence.

See also

Dissolution of the Soviet Union

References

External links

Soviet Union
1991 in the Soviet Union
Dissolution of the Soviet Union
Referendums in Azerbaijan
Referendums in Belarus
Referendums in Kazakhstan
Referendums in Kyrgyzstan
Referendums in Russia
Referendums in the Soviet Union
Referendums in Tajikistan
Referendums in Turkmenistan
Referendums in Ukraine
Referendums in Uzbekistan
Perestroika
1991 elections in Ukraine
Sovereignty referendums
March 1991 events in Asia
March 1991 events in Europe